Chinchillani may refer to:

 Chinchillani (Bolivia), a mountain in the La Paz Department, Bolivia
 Chinchillani (Oruro), a mountain in the Oruro Department, Bolivia
 Chinchillani (Peru), a mountain in Peru